Solak is a village in the Kotayk Province of Armenia. Solak is the birthplace of musician Djivan Gasparyan. The ancestors of the villagers came from Moush and Alashkert.

See also 
Kotayk Province

References

External links

World Gazeteer: Armenia – World-Gazetteer.com

Populated places in Kotayk Province